Sleeping by the Riverside is a Christian metalcore band that originated in Tampa Bay, Florida. The band formed in late 1996 and disbanded around 2003-2004. The band has had several lineup changes. Since leaving the band, members have joined bands such as, Underoath, Maylene and the Sons of Disaster, The Sugar Oaks, Affix Bayonets and Carry the Dead, who the band also did a split album with.

In 2021, the band announced a reunion for September 2021.

Influences
The band states that their influences are Shai Hulud, Strongarm, and xCulturex.

Members
 Adam Warshowsky - vocals
 Joe Harris - guitar
 Matt Gersting - guitar
 Kelly Scott Nunn - guitar, drums
 T.C. Smith - guitar
 Mike Curry - guitar
 Todd Moody - bass
 Kevin Roberts - bass
 Matt Clark - drums

Discography
Studio albums
 Untitled (1999; Split w/ Carry the Dead)
 Breath Between Battles (2002)

EPs
 Sleeping by the Riverside (1999)
 Split (2000; split with Sward)

References

External links 
 
 

Musical groups established in 1996
Musical groups disestablished in 2004
Musical groups reestablished in 2021
Tooth & Nail Records artists
Metalcore musical groups
Musical groups from Tampa, Florida
Metalcore musical groups from Florida